Karen Kraft Sloan (born 3 April 1952) is a former Canadian politician who served as a Liberal member of the House of Commons of Canada from 1993 to 2004. By career, she is a teacher and consultant.

Born in Kitchener, Ontario, Sloan first won election to Parliament for the York—Simcoe electoral district during the 1993 federal election. The 1997 and 2000 general elections saw her return to Parliament in the York North riding, which was formed after a restructuring of electoral district boundaries. Sloan thus served in the 35th, 36th, and 37th Canadian Parliaments.

After retiring from politics in 2004, she was appointed as Canada's Ambassador for the Environment on 16 February 2005. The appointment was announced by Stéphane Dion and Pierre Pettigrew who were respectively the Canadian Ministers of Environment and Foreign Affairs at the time.

Education
 1977: Bachelor of Arts (BA): University of Windsor
 1982: Bachelor of Administrative Studies (BAdmin): Brock University
 1990: Master of Environmental Studies (MES): York University

External links

1952 births
Living people
Brock University alumni
Politicians from Kitchener, Ontario
Liberal Party of Canada MPs
Members of the House of Commons of Canada from Ontario
University of Windsor alumni
York University alumni
Women members of the House of Commons of Canada
Women in Ontario politics
21st-century Canadian politicians
21st-century Canadian women politicians